Salt Records (S:alt Records - suitably:alternative) is a UK-based independent label/platform for eclectic music. Founded by Roberto Concina (aka Robert Miles) in 2000, it became the home for artists such as Robert Miles, Miles Gurtu and Blue Light Fever.
It was formed after Roberto Concina, best known with the artist name Robert Miles, split from Deconstruction/BMG and his management in London back in 1999. Salt Records have recording studios in London and Ibiza and are distributed by !K7 in Berlin (Germany).

They also run a publishing company named Hardmonic Music which is administered by Kobalt Music.

References

External links
saltrecords.com

2000 establishments in the United Kingdom
British independent record labels
Record labels based in London
Record labels established in 2000